Rodeo Cove is an embayment in Marin County, California.

Notes

Bays of California
Bays of Marin County, California
Landforms of the San Francisco Bay Area
West Marin